USS Amphion may refer to:

 , launched in 1899 as a German passenger liner (Köln) and served as a transport during World War I. She was sold for scrap in 1924.
 , was commissioned in 1946, she decommissioned in 1971 and was sold to Iran as Chah Bahar.

Sources
 

United States Navy ship names